Volume 5: Anatomic is Afro Celt Sound System's fifth album, released on October 4, 2005 by Real World Records.

Track listing
 "When I Still Needed You"
 "My Secret Bliss"
 "Mojave"
 "Sené (Working The Land)"
 "Beautiful Rain"
 "Anatomic"
 "Mother"
 "Dhol Dogs"
 "Drake"

References

Anatomic
Anatomic
Real World Records albums
Sequel albums